Acromantis luzonica, common name Luzon mantis, is a species of praying mantis found in the Philippines.

See also
List of mantis genera and species

References

Luzon
Mantodea of Southeast Asia
Endemic fauna of the Philippines
Fauna of Luzon
Insects of the Philippines
Insects described in 1920